The Speaker of the West Pakistan Legislative Assembly was the presiding officer of that legislature.

Sources
Former Speakers

Legislative Assembly, Speakers
West Pakistan Legislative Assembly
Speakers of the Provincial Assembly of West Pakistan